Onnu Randu Moonnu is a 1986 Indian Malayalam-language film, directed by Rajasenan and produced by P. Jayaraman. The film stars Urvashi, Ratheesh, Captain Raju and Unnimary in the lead roles. The film has musical score by Rajasenan.

Cast

Urvashi
Ratheesh
Captain Raju
Unnimary
Babitha Justin
Bobby Kottarakkara
Chithra
Kundara Johnny
Kaduvakulam Antony
Karamana Janardanan Nair
Kuthiravattam Pappu
Meena
Ramu
Ramyasree
Sindhu
T. G. Ravi
Valsala Menon

Soundtrack
The music was composed by Rajasenan with lyrics by Poovachal Khader.

References

External links
 

1986 films
1980s Malayalam-language films
Films directed by Rajasenan